The civil calendar is the calendar, or possibly one of several calendars, used within a country for civil, official, or administrative purposes. The civil calendar is almost always used for general purposes by people and private organizations.

The most widespread civil calendar and de facto international standard is the Gregorian calendar. Although that calendar was first declared by Pope Gregory XIII to be used in Catholic countries in 1582, it has since been adopted, as a matter of convenience, by many secular and non-Christian countries although some countries use other calendars.

Civil calendars worldwide 

168 of the world's countries use the Gregorian calendar as their sole civil calendar as of 2021. Most non-Christian countries have adopted it as a result of colonization, with some cases of voluntary adoption.

Five countries have not adopted the Gregorian calendar: Afghanistan and Iran (which use the Solar Hijri calendar), Ethiopia and Eritrea (the Ethiopian calendar), and Nepal (Vikram Samvat and Nepal Sambat). 

Four countries use a modified version of the Gregorian calendar (with eras different from Anno Domini): Japan (Japanese calendar), North Korea (North Korean Calendar), Taiwan (Minguo calendar), and Thailand (Thai solar calendar). In the former two countries, the Anno Domini era is also in use. South Korea previously used Korean calendar from 1945 to 1961.

Eighteen countries use another calendar alongside the Gregorian calendar: Algeria (Lunar Hijri calendar), Bangladesh (Bengali calendar), Egypt (Lunar Hijri calendar and Coptic calendar), India (Indian national calendar), Iraq (Lunar Hijri calendar), Israel (Hebrew calendar), Jordan, Libya, Mauritania, Morocco (Lunar Hijri calendar), Myanmar (Burmese calendar), Oman, Pakistan, Saudi Arabia, Somalia, Tunisia, United Arab Emirates, and Yemen (Lunar Hijri calendar).

See also
 List of calendars
 Chinese calendar
 Persian calendar

References 

Calendars